Christopher Mogil is an American philanthropist, and author. His book, We Gave Away a Fortune won a 1993 American Book Award. He was the co-director of the Impact Project, and is the founder of Bolder Giving.

Works
Christopher Mogil, Anne Slepian, Peter Woodrow We gave away a fortune, New Society Publishers, 1992,

References

External links
http://www.morethanmoney.org/articles.php?article=Getting_More_Involved_205
http://www.socialfunds.com/education/article.cgi?sfArticleId=8
http://boldergiving.org/staff.php?story=Christopher_and_Anne_Ellinger_117

American philanthropists
Living people
American Book Award winners
Year of birth missing (living people)